The Euroa Advertiser was an weekly newspaper first printed and published by John West in March 1884. It was located in Euroa, a town in Victoria, Australia.

From 1 March 1884 to 18 July 1884, the paper was known as the Euroa Advertiser and Violet Town, Longwood, Avenel, Strathbogie, Balmattum and Miepoll Gazette. The paper ceased in 1957, and merged with the Euroa Gazette.

References

External links 
 

1884 establishments in Australia
1957 disestablishments in Australia
Defunct newspapers published in Victoria (Australia)
Defunct weekly newspapers
Publications established in 1884
Publications disestablished in 1957
Weekly newspapers published in Australia
Euroa
Newspapers on Trove